General (Ret.) Mulyono (born 12 January 1961) is an Indonesian former general who previously served as the Chief of Staff of the Indonesian Army (Indonesian: Kepala Staf Angkatan Darat, abbreviated Kasad or KSAD). He was appointed by President of Indonesia Joko Widodo in 2015, replacing Gatot Nurmantyo who became commander (Panglima) of the Indonesian National Armed Forces.

Mulyono had graduated from the Indonesian Military Academy in 1983. Before becoming chief of staff, he had served as Chief of the Indonesian Strategic Reserve Command (Kostrad).

Military career
Mulyono graduated from Akmil (Indonesian Military Academy) in 1983 and first served as platoon commander in Sulawesi (712nd infantry battalion, 7th Military Regional Command). He later became company commander and operational officer before continuing to advanced officer education in Bandung, staying there as a member of the teaching staff until 1995.

His career carried on and he became battalion commander in 1st Military Regional Command by 1997, and then was promoted to commander of the Samarinda military district (part of 6th Military Regional Command) in 2000. He was transferred to Kostrad in 2006, initially as operational assistant to the Kostrad commander, before moving back to Magelang in 2009 to serve as commander of the cadet regiment. He was promoted to brigadier general
in 10 May 2011. Until 2013, he took up multiple positions in the Army's educational and training center before becoming operational assistant to the army chief of staff in 2013. He was promoted to a major general on 22 August 2013.

In 21 March 2014, he was moved to Jakarta to serve as the commander of the capital's military province Kodam Jaya, replacing its former commander E Hudawi Lubis (who moved to the KSAD's office). During the aforementioned position, he publicly challenged Jakarta's governor Basuki Tjahaja Purnama to normalize Jakarta's rivers and illegal street vendors, offering support from Kodam Jaya's personnel.

Six months into his leadership in Kodam Jaya, he was transferred to Kostrad and became its commander, replacing Gatot Nurmantyo who became KSAD. Mulyono was further promoted to lieutenant general on 3 October 2014.

Upon the appointment of Gatot as Commander of TNI in 2015, Mulyono was selected from three likely candidates to replace him and he became KSAD on 15 July 2015. Shortly afterwards, he was made a four-star general on 27 July.

He is set to retire in 2019. On 22 November 2018, Kostrad commander Andika Perkasa was appointed to replace him.

See also
Indonesian military ranks
Ade Supandi, navy chief of staff

References

1961 births
Living people
Indonesian generals
Indonesian National Military Academy alumni
People from Boyolali Regency
Chiefs of Staff of the Indonesian Army